The 2001–02 Eastern Counties Football League season was the 60th in the history of Eastern Counties Football League a football competition in England.

Premier Division

The Premier Division featured 20 clubs which competed in the division last season, along with two new clubs, promoted from Division One:
Dereham Town
Swaffham Town

League table

Division One

Division One featured 14 clubs which competed in the division last season, along with five new clubs:
Halstead Town, relegated from the Premier Division
Histon reserves
King's Lynn reserves
Leiston, joined from the Suffolk and Ipswich League
Warboys Town, relegated from the Premier Division

League table

References

External links
 Eastern Counties Football League

2001-02
2001–02 in English football leagues